Subbotniks ("Sabbatarians") is a common name for adherents of Russian religious movements that split from Sabbatarian sects in the late 18th century.

The majority of Subbotniks were converts to Rabbinic or Karaite Judaism from Christianity. Other groups included Judaizing Christians and Spiritual Christians.

There are three main groups of people described as Subbotniks:
 Judaizing Talmudists: Subbotnik converts to Rabbinic Judaism, also described as "Gery", "Talmudisty", or "Shaposhniki".
 Karaimites or Karaite Subbotniks: also described as "Russian Karaites", considering themselves as adherents of Karaite Judaism. They recognize only the scriptural authority of the Torah and reject the Talmud; however, it has been reported that they do not practice circumcision.
 Subbotnik Molokans: in contrast to the other Subbotnik sects, they recognize the Gospel, but also practice some of the rules and precepts of the Old Testament.

A 1912 religious census in Russia recorded 12,305 "Judaizing Talmudists", and 4,092 "Russian Karaites", and 8,412 Subbotniks who "had fallen away from Orthodoxy".

On the whole, the Subbotniks probably differed little from other Judaizing societies in their early years. They first appeared toward the end of the 18th century during the reign of Catherine the Great. According to official reports of the Russian Empire, most of the sect's followers circumcised their boys, believed in a unitary God rather than in the Christian Trinity, accepted only the Hebrew Bible and observed the Sabbath on Saturday rather than on Sunday as in Christian practice (and hence were called "sabbatarians") There were variations among their beliefs in relation to Jesus, the Second Coming, and other elements of Eastern Orthodox doctrine.

Prior to the First Partition of Poland in 1772, few Jews had settled in the Russian Empire. The Subbotniks were originally Christian peasants of the Russian Orthodox Church. During the reign of Catherine the Great (1729–1796), they adopted elements of Mosaic Law from the Old Testament and were known as "Sabbatarians", part of the Spiritual Christianity movement.

Subbotnik families settled in the Holy Land at the time part of the Ottoman Empire, in the 1880s, as part of the Zionist First Aliyah in order to escape oppression in the Russian Empire and later mostly intermarried with Jews. Examples of Israeli Jews descended from Subbotniks include Alexander Zaïd, Major-General Alik Ron, and former Israeli foreign, prime minister, and general Ariel Sharon.

History 
Subbotniks, meaning sabbatarians for their observance of the Sabbath on Saturday, as in the Hebrew Bible, rather than on Sunday, arose as part of the Spiritual Christian movement in the 18th century. Imperial Russian officials and Orthodox clergy considered the Subbotniks to be heretical to Russian Orthodox religion, and tried to suppress their sects and other Judaizers. They also emphasized individual interpretation of the law rather than accepting the Talmud or clergy. The Subbotniks concealed their religious beliefs and rites from Orthodox Christians. The Russian government eventually deported the Subbotniks, isolating them from Orthodox Christians and Jews.

The Subbotniks observed the Sabbath on Saturday, and were also known as sabbatarians. They avoided work and tried to avoid discussing worldly affairs. Apart from practicing circumcision of boys, many began to slaughter their food animals according to the laws of shechita when they could learn the necessary rules. Some clandestinely used phylacteries, tzitzit (ritual tassels), and mezuzot (doorpost markings), and prayed in private houses of prayer. As their practice deepened, some acquired Jewish "siddur" prayer books with Russian translation for their prayers. The hazzan (cantor) read the prayers aloud, and the congregants prayed silently; during prayers a solemn silence was observed throughout the house.

According to the testimony, private and official, of all those who studied their mode of life in tsarist times, the Subbotniks were remarkably industrious; reading and writing, hospitable, not given to drunkenness, poverty, or prostitution. Up to 1820 the Subbotniks lived for the most part in the governments of Voronezh, Oryol, Moscow, Tula, and Saratov. After that year, the government deported those who openly acknowledged their membership in the sect to the foothills of the Caucasus, to Transcaucasia, and to the Siberian governments of Irkutsk, Tobolsk, and Yeniseisk. In 1912, the government's Interior Ministry recorded 8,412 Subbotniks; 12,305 Judaizing Talmudists; and 4,092 Russian Karaites.

Under Alexander I and Nicholas I 
Under Alexander I's policies of general tolerance, the Subbotniks enjoyed a great deal of freedom. But the Russian clergy opposed them and killed about 100 Subbotniks and their spiritual leaders in Mogilev, in present-day Belarus, including the former archbishop Romantzov. In addition, Romantzov's young son was tortured with red-hot irons before being burned at the stake. The Subbotniks came to an agreement with the Russian Orthodox priests and succeeded in gaining a measure of peace for a period. To compensate the Church for any loss of finances due to the Subbotniks leaving their congregations, the members of the sect undertook to pay the Church the usual fee of two Russian rubles for every birth and three rubles for every marriage. The tsar permitted the Subbotniks to profess their faith openly, but prohibited them from hiring rabbis or proselytizing among Christians.

Under Nicholas I, the Subbotniks began to feel restless. Some wanted to embrace Judaism and traveled into the Pale of Settlement in order to learn more about Judaism. Upon learning this, the Russian government sent a number of priests to the Subbotniks to try to persuade them to return to Russian Orthodoxy. When the priests did not meet with any appreciable success, the government decided to suppress the Subbotniks with force. In 1826, the government decided to deport those who lived openly as Subbotniks to internal exile in the above-mentioned regions in the Caucasus, Transcaucasia, and Siberia. At the same time, it prohibited Jews and members of the Russian Orthodox Church from settling among any Subbotniks.

Zionism and settlement in Ottoman Palestine 

Subbotnik communities were among early supporters of Zionism. During the First Aliyah at the end of the 19th century, thousands of Subbotniks settled in Ottoman Palestine to escape religious persecution due to their differences with the Russian Orthodox Church. Some Subbotniks had immigrated to Ottoman Palestine even prior to the First Aliyah. 

The Subbotniks faced hurdles when intermarrying into the wider Jewish population, as they were not considered Jews according to halakha. They were noted for often being more religiously observant than the mostly secular Jewish Zionist population in that period. They Hebraized their surnames to assimilate. Within a short period, the descendants of Subbotnik Jews who arrived in Ottoman Palestine in the late 19th century had completely blended and inter-married into the wider Jewish population of Israel.

The Tora-centered Bnei Moshe movement ties with the Subbotniks and formed the majority of the port Jaffa's population. In 1904, later famous Zionist rabbi Abraham Isaac Kook was invited by them to become their rabbi. The appointment of Rav Kook brought them closer to the Jewish religious mainstream.

Soviet period

Holocaust 
Subbotniks in Nazi-occupied areas of Ukraine were killed by SS Einsatzgruppen troops and local Ukrainian collaborators due to their Jewish self-identity. They were relatively recent migrants to Ukraine from areas of Voronezh and considered outsiders by the peasants, who noted their practice of some Jewish customs. During the Holocaust, Nazis killed thousands of Subbotniks. By contrast, they did not attack Crimean Karaites, accepting the state's records that they were ethnic Tatars (or Khazars).

Post-WW2 
Following their massacre in the Holocaust, the Subbotniks came to have an increasingly nationalist self-identification as Jews. However, after the War, the Soviet government ceased to recognize the "Subbotnik" as a legal ethnic category. They counted these people as a subset of the ethnic Russian population.

Between 1973 and 1991, the Subbotniks of Ilyinka in Voronezh Oblast emigrated to Israel.

Post-Soviet era
After the fall of the Soviet Union, a few thousand Subbotniks left Russia for Israel. This coincided with the 1990s Post-Soviet aliyah to Israel of more than a million Russian Jews and members of their immediate families. Since that period, Subbotniks remaining in Russia have encountered status-related problems. In the 21st century, the Shavei Israel organization for outreach to "lost Jews" and related communities, appointed a rabbi for the Subbotniks at Vysoky in Voronezh Oblast. The objective of teaching them Judaism and facilitate their formal conversion to Orthodox Judaism would make them eligible for aliyah to Israel.

State of Israel
In the early 21st century, the issue arose of the Jewish identity of some members of Moshav Yitav, located in the Jordan Valley north of Jericho in the West Bank, who were Subbotniks, immigrants from former Soviet Georgia. In 2004, the Sephardic Chief Rabbi of Israel Shlomo Amar ruled the Subbotniks were not defined as Jewish and would have to undergo an Orthodox conversion. The Interior Ministry classified the Subbotniks as a Christian sect and ineligible for aliyah to Israel, because no one knew if their ancestors had formally converted to Judaism (and there is much historic evidence that they did not). The ruling was abolished in 2014, with an attempt by the Interior Ministry to allow remaining Subbotnik families to immigrate to Israel.

Statistics 
It has been difficult to estimate the exact number of Subbotniks in Russia at any given time. The discrepancies between government statistics and the membership have varied widely. Official data from tsarist times placed the membership of the sect at several thousand. The writer E. Deinard, who was in personal contact with the Subbotniks, said in 1887 there were 2,500,000. Deinard may have included in his figures all of the Judaizing sects, and not just the Subbotniks, as this estimate is not supported by any other historians. Apart from their religious rites, the Subbotniks were generally indistinguishable from Russian Orthodox or secular Russians in terms of dress and lifestyle.

Subbotnik Karaites

Distribution 
Besides Tambov, Subbotnik Karaites also lived in Saratov Oblast, Astrakhan Oblast, Volgograd Oblast, Stavropol Krai, Samara Oblast, Khakassia, Irkutsk Oblast along the Molochna River in Novorossiya, in Krasnodar Krai, Armenia and Azerbaijan and along the Russian Empire's borders with Iran. While not all statistics for all provinces are readily available, there are more than 2500 in Privolnoye, Azerbaijan alone.

Characteristics 
From 1870 they began to use the "Everyday Prayers for Karaites" by Abraham Firkovich (1870, Vilnius) for their liturgy, which in 1882 they were allowed to publish in Russian as "Порядок молитв для караимов". It was based on the Siddur Tefillot keMinhag haKaraim by Isaak ben Solomon Ickowicz. The Subbotnik Karaites had contacts with the Crimean Karaites, who, to a degree, exemplified for them "a Jewish model to be imitated", "were occasional and never formally arranged since, in particular, normative Karaism denied the acceptance of proselytes and regarded the very existence of a community of Karaites of non-Jewish origin senseless."

Distribution 
Due to tsarist persecution, Subbotniks spread out creating a wide diaspora, living since the 19th century in the following countries and regions:
 Armenia
 Australia
 Azerbaijan
 Belarus
 Bulgaria (Southern Dobruja region)
 France
 Georgia
 Iran
 Israel
 Moldova 
 Poland
 Romania (Northern Dobruja region)
 Russia
 Ukraine
 Uruguay
 United States
 Uzbekistan

Notable people 
 Andrey Dubrovin (1863–1967), farmer and Zionist pioneer
 Alexander Zaïd (1886–1938), founding member of two Jewish self-defense militias

See also 

 Christianity and Judaism
 Ger toshav
 Judaizers
 Khazars
 Messianic Judaism
 Noahides
 Proselyte
 Righteous among the Nations
 Righteous gentiles
 San Nicandro Jews
 Spiritual Christianity

References

Bibliography 
 Astyrev, N. "Subbotniki v Rossii i Sibiri". In Syeverny Vyestnik, 1891, No. 6.
 Dinard, E. In Ha-Meliẓ, 1887, No. 75.
 
 Kostomarov, Russkaya Istoriya, vol. i.
 
 Univ. Isr. 1854, p. 396.

External links 
 Armenian Subbotniks
 Articles from the Shavei Israel website:
 Save the Subbotniks (17 February 2005)
 Saving the Subbotniks (22 March 2005)
 Saving Russia’s Subbotnik Jews (20 May 2005)
 Russian Runaround (30 April 2006)
 Ken sos los Subbotniks? "Who are the Subbotniks?" (article is in Ladino), Turkey
 The Subbotniki Information Exchange website (Cубботники, Subbotniks) ...preserving our Subbotnik heritage.

Groups who converted to Judaism
Jewish Christianity
Nontrinitarian denominations
Religion in Israel
Russian Jews
Seventh-day denominations